Handball at the 2005 Islamic Solidarity Games was held in Mecca from April 9 to April 19, 2005.

Preliminary round

Group A

Group B

Group C

Group D

Qualifying round

Group E

Group F

Knockout round

External links
Goalzz

Islamic Games
2005 Islamic Solidarity Games
2005 Islamic Solidarity Games
Handball in Saudi Arabia
2005